Piccadilly Market at St James's Church Piccadilly is a market in the St James's district of the City of Westminster. It is open six days a week and occupies the courtyard on the North side of St James's Church, Piccadilly. It is close to Piccadilly Circus, Fortnum & Mason and The Ritz London Hotel.

History
An Arts and Crafts market was first held at St James's Church, Piccadilly in 1981 as part of the Piccadilly Arts Festival. The market opened permanently in 1984, operating just two days a week. Since then Piccadilly Market has expanded and grown.

Traders
Rent paid by traders contributes to the upkeep of St James's Church Piccadilly: a Sir Christopher Wren masterpiece.

Piccadilly Market was described by Time Out Magazine as where "quintessential church fête meets West End London chic."

Gallery

See also
St James's Church, Piccadilly
St James's

References

External links
 Piccadilly Market
 St James's Church Piccadilly

Retail markets in London
Shopping streets in London
Streets in the City of Westminster
Tourist attractions in London